This is an alphabetical list of composers from Italy, whose notability is established by reliable sources in other Wikipedia articles. For guidance on how an individual name should be sorted, please refer to the person's linked article (including title, text, references, and any DefaultSort templates visible when editing) and to the English Wikipedia guidelines at WP:SUR.

The portraits at right are ten of the most-prominent Italian composers, according to a published review.

A
Joseph Abaco (1710–1805), born Giuseppe Marie Clément Ferdinand dall'Abaco
Marcello Abbado (1926–2020)
Antonio Maria Abbatini (1595–after 1679)
Girolamo Abos (1715–1760)
Andrea Adolfati (1721/22–1760)
Giovanni Battista Agneletti (fl. 1656–1673)
Maria Teresa Agnesi Pinottini (1720–1795)
Lodovico Agostini (1534–1590)
Paolo Agostino (c.1583–1629)
Pirro Albergati (1663–1735)
Domenico Alberti (c.1710–1740)
Gasparo Alberti (c.1485–c.1560)
Innocentio Alberti (c.1535–1615)
Ignazio Albertini (1644–1685), also known as Albertino
Tomaso Albinoni (1671–1751), Venetian composer of opera and instrumental music, the "Adagio in G minor" is based on his works
Vincenzo Albrici (1631–1695/96)
Giovanni Maria Alemanni (fl. 1500–1525)
Raffaella Aleotti (c.1570–after 1646)
Vittoria Aleotti (c.1575–after 1620), Raffaella's sister or possibly the same person
Felice Alessandri (1747–1798)
Alessandro Alessandroni (1925–2017)
Franco Alfano (1875–1954)
Salvatore Allegra (1898–1993)
Domenico Allegri (c. 1585–1629)
Gregorio Allegri (1582–1652), composer of the famous Miserere, copied from memory on two hearings by the 14-year-old Mozart
Filippo Amadei (fl. 1690–1730)
Gaetano Amadeo (1824–1893)
Marco Ambrosini (born 1964)
Felice Anerio (c.1560–1614)
Giovanni Francesco Anerio (c.1567–1630)
Pasquale Anfossi (1727–1797)
Giovanni Animuccia (c.1500–1571)
Paolo Animuccia (died 1563)
Andrea Antico (c.1480– after 1538)
Giovanni Giacomo de Antiquis (?–1608)
Pietro Antonacci (c.1710–c.1777)
Antonello da Caserta (late 14th – early 15th century)
Antonio da Cividale (fl. 1392–1421)
Giuseppe Apolloni (1822–1889)
Francesco Araja (1709–1762/70)
Attilio Ariosti (1666–1729)
Pietro Aron (c.1480– after 1545)
Giovanni Artusi (c.1540–1613)
Giammateo Asola (1532 or earlier –1609)
Caterina Assandra (c.1590–after 1618)
Gennaro Astarita (c.1745/49–1805)
Emanuele d'Astorga (1680–1757)
Pietro Auletta (1698–1771)
Giuseppe Avitrano (c.1670–1756)
Filippo Azzaiolo (c.1530/40–after 1570)

B
Ippolito Baccusi (c. 1550–1609)
Rosa Giacinta Badalla (c. 1660–c. 1710)
Pietro Baldassare (c. 1683–after 1768)
Paolo Baltaro (born 1967)
Adriano Banchieri (1568–1634)
Banda Osiris (group, formed 1980)
Emanuele Barbella (1718–1777)
Giovanni de' Bardi (1534–1612)
Sergio Bardotti (1939–2007)
Francesco Barsanti (1690–1775)
Girolamo Bartei (c. 1570–c. 1618)
Bartolino da Padova (fl. c. 1365 – c. 1405)
Erasmo di Bartolo (1606–1656)
Bartolomeo da Bologna (fl. 1405–1427)
Bartolomeo degli Organi (1474–1539)
Angelo Michele Bartolotti (died before 1682)
Bruno Bartolozzi (1911–1980)
Domenico Bartolucci (1917–2013), cardinal, director of Sistine Chapel Choir
Pippo Barzizza (1902–1994)
Giulio Bas (1874–1929)
Giovanni Battista Bassani (c. 1650–1716)
Orazio Bassani (before 1570–1615), also Orazio della Viola
Giovanni Bassano (c. 1561–1617)
Franco Battiato (1945–2021)
Leda Battisti (born 1971)
Lucio Battisti (1943–1998)
Antonio Bazzini (1818–1897)
Giuseppe Becce (1877–1973)
Gianni Bella (born 1947)
Lodovico Bellanda (c.1575–after 1613) 
Vincenzo Bellavere (c.1540/41–1587)
Domenico Belli (died 1627)
Giulio Belli (c.1560– 1621 or later)
Vincenzo Bellini (1801–1835), famous for his opera Norma
Pietro Paolo Bencini (c. 1670–1755)
Cesare Bendinelli (c. 1542–1617)
Marco I. Benevento (born 1978)
Orazio Benevoli (1605–1672)
Luciano Berio (1925–2003), wrote Sinfonia, Un re in ascolto, and Passaggio
Ercole Bernabei (1622–1687)
Stefano Bernardi (c.1577–1637)
Marcello Bernardini (1730/40–c.1799)
Andrea Bernasconi (c. 1706–1784)
Antonio Bertali (1605–1669)
Mario Bertoncini (1932–2019)
Ferdinando Bertoni (1725–1813)
Carlo Besozzi (1738–1791)
Girolamo Besozzi (c. 1745/50–1788)
Marco Betta (born 1964)
Bruno Bettinelli (1913–2004)
Francesco Bianchi (1752–1810), also Giuseppe Francesco Bianchi
Oscar Bianchi (born 1975), wrote Thanks to My Eyes
Giancarlo Bigazzi (1940–2012)
Umberto Bindi (1932–2002)
Cesare Andrea Bixio (1896–1978)
Felice Blangini (1781–1841)
Luigi Boccherini (1743–1805)
Andrea Bocelli (born 1958), co-writing credits include "Because We Believe" and "Perfect Symphony"
Arrigo Boito (1842–1918), born Enrico Giuseppe Giovanni Boito
Anna Bon (c.1739–after 1767)
Valerio Bona (c.1560–c.1620)
Giacinto Bondioli (1596–1636)
Fred Bongusto (1935–2019)
Laura Bono (born 1979)
Antonio Maria Bononcini (1677–1726)
Giovanni Bononcini (1670–1747)
Giovanni Maria Bononcini (1642–1678), father of Giovanni and Antonio
Francesco Antonio Bonporti (1672–1749)
Pietro Borradori (born 1965)
Costante Adolfo Bossi (1876–1953), brother of Marco Enrico Bossi
Marco Enrico Bossi (1861–1925)
Franciscus Bossinensis (fl. 1509–1511)
Luigi Bottazzo (1845–1924)
Cosimo Bottegari (1554–1620)
Giovanni Bottesini (1821–1889)
Giuseppe Antonio Brescianello (c. 1690–1758), also Bressonelli
Antonio Brioschi (fl. c. 1725–1750)
Riccardo Broschi (c. 1698–1756)
Antonio Brunelli (1577–1630)
Gaetano Brunetti (1744–1798)
Elisabetta Brusa (born 1954)
Valentino Bucchi (1916–1976)
Giovanni Battista Buonamente (c. 1595–1642)
Paolo Buonvino (born 1970)
Ferruccio Busoni (1866–1924)
Sylvano Bussotti (1931–2021)

C
Francesca Caccini (1587–c. 1641), daughter of Giulio
Giulio Caccini (1551–1618)
Settimia Caccini (1591–c. 1638), daughter of Giulio
Pasquale Cafaro (1715–1787)
Antonio Caldara (1670–1736)
Giuseppe Cambini (c.1746–c.1825)
Bartolomeo Campagnoli (1751–1827)
Fabio Campana (1819–1882)
Bruno Canfora (1924-2017)
Bruno Canino (born 1935)
Enrico Cannio (1874–1949)
Vincenzo Capirola (1474–after 1548)
Filippo Capocci (1840–1911)
Gaetano Capocci (1811–1898)
Claudio Capponi (born 1959)
Matteo Capranica (1708–c.1776)
Giovanni Paolo Capriolo (c. 1580–c. 1627), also Caprioli
Marchetto Cara (c. 1470–c. 1525)
Ezio Carabella (1891–1964)
Michele Carafa (1787–1872)
Matteo Carcassi (1792–1853)
Salvatore Cardillo (1874–1947)
Cristoforo Caresana (c.1640–1709)
Giacomo Carissimi (1605–1674)
Roberto Carnevale (born 1966)
Renato Carosone (1920–2001)
Fiorenzo Carpi (1918–1997)
Ferdinando Carulli (1770–1841)
Giuseppe "Pippo" Caruso (1935–2018)
Claudio Casciolini (1697–1760)
Alfredo Casella (1883–1947)
Giulio Castagnoli (born 1958)
Bellerofonte Castaldi (1580–1649)
Dario Castello (c. 1590–c. 1658)
Mario Castelnuovo-Tedesco (1895–1968)
Niccolò Castiglioni (1932–1996)
Pietro Castrucci (1679–1752)
Leonello Casucci (1885–1975)
Maddalena Casulana (c. 1544–c. 1590)
Alfredo Catalani (1854–1893)
Diomedes Cato (c. 1560/65–after 1618)
Emilio de' Cavalieri (1550–1602)
Francesco Cavalli (1602–1676), born Pietro Francesco Caletti-Bruni
Giuseppe Cavallo (died 1684)
Girolamo Cavazzoni (c.1525–after 1577)
Marco Antonio Cavazzoni (c.1490–c.1560)
Maurizio Cazzati (1616–1678)
Carlo Cecere (1706–1761)
Adriano Celentano (born 1938)
Bonaventura Cerronio (fl. 1639)
Sulpitia Cesis (1577-?)
Antonio Cesti (1623–1669)
Ippolito Chamaterò (late 1530s – after 1592), also known as Chamatterò di Negri, Camaterò
Fortunato Chelleri (1690–1757), also Keller, Kelleri, Kellery, Cheler 
Luigi Cherubini (1760–1842)
Giancarlo Chiaramello (born 1939)
Piero Ciampi (1934–1980)
Cesare Ciardi (1818–1877)
Alessandro Cicognini (1906–1995)
Antonio Cifra (c.1584–1629)
Francesco Cilea (1866–1950)
Giovanni Paolo Cima (c.1570–1622)
Domenico Cimarosa (1749–1801)
Roberto Ciotti (1953–2013)
Stelvio Cipriani (1937–2018)
Giovanni Battista Cirri (1724–1808)
Aldo Clementi (1925–2011)
Muzio Clementi (1752–1832)
Carlo Coccia (1782–1873)
Lelio Colista (1629–1680)
Giuseppe Colombi (1635–1694)
Giovanni Paolo Colonna (1637–1695)
Nicola Conforto (1718–1793)
Fabius Constable (born 1973)
Paolo Conte (born 1937)
Francesco Bartolomeo Conti (1681/82–1732)
Ubaldo Continiello (1941–2014)
Francesco Corbetta (c.1615–1681)
Arcangelo Corelli (1653–1713)
Azio Corghi (1937–2022)
Gaetano Coronaro (1852–1908)
Giuseppe Corsi da Celano (1631/32–1691), also known as Celani
Francesco Corteccia (1502–1571)
Chiara Margarita Cozzolani (1602–c.1676/78)
Giovanni Croce (1557–1609)
Toto Cutugno (born 1943)

D
 Luca D'Alberto (born 1983)
Lucio Dalla (1943–2012)
Evaristo Felice Dall'Abaco (1675–1742)
Girolamo Dalla Casa (died 1601), also known as Hieronymo de Udene
Luigi Dallapiccola (1904–1975), composer of Il prigioniero
Marco Dall'Aquila (c. 1480–after 1538)
Domenico Dall'Oglio (c. 1700–1764)
Joan Ambrosio Dalza (fl. 1508)
Nino D'Angelo (born 1957)
Pino Daniele (1955–2015)
Giovanni D'Anzi (1906–1974)
Padre Davide da Bergamo (1791–1863), born Felice Moretti
Cecilia Dazzi (born 1969)
Fabrizio De André (1940–1999)
Guido De Angelis (born 1944)
Maurizio De Angelis (born 1947), brother of Guido
Anthony de Countie (died 1579)
Ernesto De Curtis (1875–1937)
Francesco de Layolle (or dell'Aiolle) (1492–c. 1540)
Riccardo Del Turco (born 1939)
Fernando De Luca (born 1961)
Francesco De Masi (1930–2005)
Fabrizio Dentice (c. 1539 – c. 1581)
Luigi Dentice (c. 1510–1566)
Scipione Dentice (1560–1633), grandson of Luigi, nephew of Fabrizio
Luigi Denza (1846–1922), Neapolitan song composer of Funiculì, Funiculà
Manuel De Peppe (born 1970)
Manuel De Sica (1949–2014)
Christian De Walden (born 1946)
Eduardo Di Capua (1865–1917)
Girolamo Diruta (c. 1554–after 1610)
Salvatore Di Vittorio (born 1967)
Pino Donaggio (born 1941)
Baldassare Donato (1525/30–1603), also known as Donati
Donato da Cascia (fl. c. 1350–1370)
Franco Donatoni (1927–2000)
Stefano Donaudy (1879–1925)
Carlo Donida (1920–1998)
Gaetano Donizetti (1797–1848), opera composer, known for Lucia di Lammermoor and L'elisir d'amore among others
Paolo Dossena (born 1942)
Antonio Draghi (c. 1634–1700)
Giovanni Battista Draghi (c. 1640–1708), not the later namesake known as Pergolesi
Domenico Dragonetti (1763–1846)
Egidio Duni (1708–1775)
Francesco Durante (1684–1755)

E
Ludovico Einaudi (born 1955)
Sergio Endrigo (1933–2005)
Michele Esposito (1855–1929)
Franco Evangelisti (1926–1980)

F
Franco Faccio (1840–1891)
Giacomo Facco (1676–1753)
Michelangelo Faggioli (1666–1733)
Nicola Fago (1677–1745)
Mirko Fait (born 1965)
Michele de Falco (c. 1688 – after 1732)
Andrea Falconieri (1585/86–1656), also known as Falconiero
Michelangelo Falvetti (1642–1692)
Guido Alberto Fano (1875–1961)
Carlo Farina (c. 1600–1639)
Giuseppe Farinelli (1769–1836), born Giuseppe Francesco Finco
Giovanni Battista Fasolo (c. 1598 – after 1664)
Alfio Fazio (born 1959)
Ivan Fedele (born 1953)
Fedele Fenaroli (1730–1818)
Francesco Feo (1691–1761)
Giuseppe Ferlendis (1755–1810)
Alfonso Ferrabosco the elder (1543–1588)
Domenico Ferrabosco (1513–1574)
Giovanni Battista Ferrandini (c. 1710–1791)
Benedetto Ferrari (c. 1603–1681)
Domenico Ferrari (1722–1780)
Lorenzo Ferrero (born 1951)
Gianni Ferrio (1924–2013)
Costanzo Festa (c. 1485/90–1545)
Sebastiano Festa (c. 1490/95–1524)
Nico Fidenco (born 1933), also known as Domenico Colarossi
Francesco Filidei (born 1973)
Gino Filippini (1900–1962)
Giacomo Finetti (?–1630)
Aldo Finzi (1897–1945)
Valentino Fioravanti (1764–1837)
Nicola Fiorenza (after 1700 –1764)
Ignazio Fiorillo (1715–1787)
Pietro Floridia (1860–1932)
Francesco Florimo (1800–1888)
Antonio Florio (born 1956)
Francesco Foggia (1603–1688)
Giacomo Fogliano (1468–1548)
Giovanni Battista Fontana (c. 1580/89–c. 1630)
Jimmy Fontana (1934–2013), born Enrico Sbriccoli
Alfonso Fontanelli (1557–1622)
Zucchero Fornaciari (born 1955)
Alberto Fortis (born 1955)
Giovanni Paolo Foscarini (c. 1600– after 1649)
Ivano Fossati (born 1951)
Armando Fragna (1898–1972)
Petronio Franceschini (1651–1680)
Francesco Canova da Milano (1497–1543)
Luca Francesconi (born 1956)
Alberto Franchetti (1860–1942)
Massimiliano Frani (born 1967)
Vito Frazzi (1888–1975)
Girolamo Frescobaldi (1583–1643), organist at St. Peter's Basilica and widely influential keyboard composer
Fabio Frizzi (born 1951)
Francesco Paolo Frontini (1860–1939)
Martino Frontini (1827–1909)
Adolfo Fumagalli (1828–1856), one of several composer brothers
Disma Fumagalli (1826–1893), one of several composer brothers
Luca Fumagalli (1837–1908), one of several composer brothers
Polibio Fumagalli (1830–1900), one of several composer brothers
Giovanni Fusco (1906–1968)

G
Michele Gabellone (1692–1740), also Cabalone, etc.
Andrea Gabrieli (c.1533–1585), uncle of Giovanni
Giovanni Gabrieli (1557–1612), composer and organist
Domenico Gabrielli (1651–1690)
Franchinus Gaffurius (1451–1522), also Franchino Gaffurio
Marco da Gagliano (1582–1643)
Michelagnolo Galilei (1575–1631), brother of Galileo
Vincenzo Galilei (c. 1520–1591), father of Galileo
Domenico Gallo (1730–c. 1768)
Baldassare Galuppi (1706–1785)
Giuseppe Garibaldi (1819–1908), a younger namesake of Italy's founder
Giuseppe Gariboldi (1833–1905)
Carlo Giorgio Garofalo (1886–1962)
Giorgio Gaslini (1929–2014)
Francesco Gasparini (1661–1727)
Quirino Gasparini (1721–1778)
Giovanni Giacomo Gastoldi (c. 1554–1609)
Luigi Gatti (1740–1817)
Roberto Gatto (born 1958)
Vittorio Gelmetti (1926–1992)
Francesco Geminiani (1687–1762)
Pietro Generali (1773–1832)
Ignazio Gerusalemme (1707–1769)
Carlo Gesualdo (1566–1613), chromatic madrigalist, nobleman, killer
Giorgio Ghedini (1892–1965)
Gherardello da Firenze (c. 1320/25 – 1362/63)
Giuseppe Gherardeschi (1759–1815)
Benedetto Ghiglia (1921–2012)
Giovanni Ghizzolo (c. 1580–c. 1625)
Geminiano Giacomelli (1692–1740)
Antonio Giannettini (1648–1721)
Jacopo Gianninoto (born 1973)
Felice Giardini (1716–1796)
Remo Giazotto (1910–1998)
Marcello Giombini (1928–2003)
Carmine Giordani (c. 1685–1758)
Giuseppe Giordani (1751–1798)
Tommaso Giordani (c. 1730–1806)
Umberto Giordano (1867–1948)
Giovanni Giorgi (c. 1700–1762)
Giovanni da Cascia (14th century)
Pietro Antonio Giramo (fl. 1619–c. 1630)
Mauro Giuliani (1781–1829), virtuoso guitarist and composer
Simone Giuliani (born 1973)
Goblin (group, formed 1972), previously named Oliver and Cherry Five
Franco Godi (born 1940)
Roberto Goitre (1927–1980)
Lallo Gori (1927–1982)
Sandro Gorli (born 1948)
Enzo Gragnaniello (born 1954)
Giovanni Battista Granata (1620/21–1687)
Alessandro Grandi (1586–1630)
Gaetano Greco (c.1657–c.1728)
Lucio Gregoretti (born 1961)
Giovanni Lorenzo Gregori (1663–1745)
Giovanni Battista Grillo (late 16th century–1622)
Niccolò Grillo (fl. 1720s)
Carlo Grossi (c. 1634–1688)
Gioseffo Guami (1542–1611)
Emilia Gubitosi (1887–1972)
Andrea Guerra (born 1961)
Pietro Alessandro Guglielmi (1728–1804)
Cesario Gussago (fl. 1599–1612)

H
Hoste da Reggio (c. 1520–1569), also known as L'Hoste, L'Osto, Oste, Bartolomeo Torresano

I
Sigismondo d'India (c. 1582–1629)
Marc'Antonio Ingegneri (c. 1535/36–1592)
Carlo Innocenzi (1899–1962)
Giacomo Insanguine (1728–1793)
Paolo Isnardi (c. 1536–1596)
Ivan Iusco (born 1970)

J
Giuseppe Maria Jacchini (1667–1727)
Jacopo da Bologna (fl. 1340 – c. 1386)
Enzo Jannacci (1935–2013)
Giuseppe Jannacconi (1740–1816)
Niccolò Jommelli (1714–1774)

K
Giovanni Girolamo Kapsperger (c. 1580–1651), also known as Johann(es) Hieronymus Kapsberger or Giovanni Geronimo Kapsperger
Ernesto Köhler (1849–1907)
Gorni Kramer (1913–1995)

L
Giovanni Battista Lampugnani (c. 1708–1786)
Stefano Landi (c. 1586–1639)
Francesco Landini (c. 1325/35–1397), also known as Landino, degli Organi, il Cieco, or da Firenze
Salvatore Lanzetti (c. 1710–c. 1780)
Gaetano Latilla (1711–1788)
Felice Lattuada (1882–1962)
Bruno Lauzi (1937–2006)
Angelo Francesco Lavagnino (1909–1987)
Luigi Legnani (1790–1877)
Giovanni Legrenzi (1626–1690)
Stefano Lentini (born 1974)
Leonardo Leo (1694–1744)
Isabella Leonarda (1620–1704)
Ruggiero Leoncavallo (1858–1919), composer of the tragic opera, Pagliacci
Leone Leoni (c. 1560–1627)
Giuseppe Liberto (born 1943)
Francesco Libetta (born 1968)
Alphonsus Maria de' Liguori (1696–1787), bishop, saint, composer of Tu scendi dalle stelle
Giuseppe Lillo (1814–1863)
Roberto Livraghi (born 1937)
Mimmo Locasciulli (born 1949)
Pietro Locatelli (1695–1764)
Nicola Bonifacio Logroscino (1698–c. 1765)
Antonio Lolli (c. 1725–1802)
Carlo Ambrogio Lonati (c. 1645–c. 1712), also Lunati
Alessandro Longo (1864–1945)
Paolo Lorenzani (1640–1713)
Lorenzo da Firenze (d. 1372/73)
Antonio Lotti (1667–1740)
Andrea Lo Vecchio (1942–2021)
Andrea Luchesi (1741–1801)
Giovanni Lorenzo Lulier (c. 1662–1700), nicknamed Giovannino del Violone (Little John of the Violin)
Jean-Baptiste Lully (1632–1687), born Giovanni Battista Lulli
Filippo de Lurano (c. 1475–after 1520), also known as Luprano, Lorano
Luzzasco Luzzaschi (c. 1545–1607)

M
Teodulo Mabellini (1817–1897)
Bruno Maderna (1920–1973), composer of Satyricon (opera)
Enrico Mainardi (1897–1976)
Giorgio Mainerio (c.1530/40–1582)
Stefano Mainetti (born 1957)
Gian Francesco de Majo (1732–1770)
Giuseppe de Majo (1697–1771)
Maurizio Malagnini (born c.1984)
Enzo Malepasso (1954–2009)
Gian Francesco Malipiero (1882–1973)
Riccardo Malipiero (1914–2003)
Cristofano Malvezzi (1547–1599)
Luigi Mancinelli (1848–1921)
Francesco Mancini (1672–1737)
Francesco Manelli (c. 1595–1667)
Francesco Manfredini (1684–1762)
Vincenzo Manfredini (1737–1799)
Nicola Antonio Manfroce (1791–1813)
Giuseppe Mango (1954–2014)
Gennaro Manna (1715–1779)
Carlo Mannelli (1640–1697)
Franco Mannino (1924–2005) 
Alessandro Marcello (1669–1747), composer of the famous Oboe Concerto in D minor
Benedetto Marcello (1686–1739), brother of Alessandro
Fermo Dante Marchetti (1876–1940)
Gianni Marchetti (1933–2012)
Lele Marchitelli (born 1955)
Rita Marcotulli (born 1959)
Luca Marenzio (c. 1553–1599), composer of approximately 500 madrigals
Dario Marianelli (born 1963)
Detto Mariano (1937–2020)
Marco Marinangeli (born 1965)
Biagio Marini (1594–1663)
Gino Marinuzzi (1882–1945)
E. A. Mario (1884–1961), born Giovanni Gaeta
Giulio Cesare Martinengo (c. 1564/68–1613)
Giovanni Battista Martini (1706–1784)
Giuseppe Martucci (1856–1909)
Pietro Mascagni (1863–1945), opera composer, known for Cavalleria rusticana
Michele Mascitti (1664–1760)
Tiburtio Massaino (before 1550–after 1608), also Massaini and Tiburzio
Pino Massara (1931–2013)
Domenico Massenzio (1586–1657)
Tito Mattei (1839–1914)
Nicola Matteis (fl. c. 1670–after 1714), also Matheis
Matteo da Perugia (fl. 1400–1416)
Claudio Mattone (born 1943)
Ascanio Mayone (c. 1565–1627)
Gianni Mazza (born 1944)
Domenico Mazzocchi (1592–1665)
Virgilio Mazzocchi (1597–1646), brother of Domenico
Antonio Maria Mazzoni (1717–1785)
Giovanni Mazzuoli (c. 1360–1426)
Alessandro Melani (1639–1703)
Gian Carlo Menotti (1911–2007)
Saverio Mercadante (1795–1870)
Tarquinio Merula (1595–1665)
Claudio Merulo (1533–1604)
Franco Micalizzi (born 1939)
Giorgio Miceli (1836–1895)
Amedeo Minghi (born 1947)
Ambrogio Minoja (1752–1825)
Domenico Modugno (1928–1994)
Simone Molinaro (c. 1565–1615)
Francesco Molino (1775–1847), also known as François Molino
David Monacchi (born 1970)
Antonio Montanari (1676–1737)
Claudio Monteverdi (1567–1643), best known for his pioneering opera Orfeo
Gaetano Monti (c. 1750– c. 1816)
Vittorio Monti (1868–1922)
Carlo Ignazio Monza (c. 1680–1739)
Giovanni Morandi (1777–1856)
Guido Morini (born 1959)
Francesco Morlacchi (1784–1841)
Luigi Morleo (born 1970)
Giorgio Moroder (born 1940), pop songwriter with three Academy Awards and four Grammy Awards
Andrea Morricone (born 1964), film composer, son of Ennio
Ennio Morricone (1928–2020), prolific film composer with two Academy Awards and four Grammy Awards
Virgilio Mortari (1902–1993)
Luigi Mosca (1775–1824)
Giovanni Mossi (c. 1680?–1742)
Emilio Munda (born 1982)

N
Giovanni Bernardino Nanino (c. 1560–1623)
Giovanni Maria Nanino (1543/44–1607), also Nanini
Gianna Nannini (born 1954)
Pietro Nardini (1722–1793)
Mario Nascimbene (1913–2002)
Mariella Nava (born 1960)
Marcantonio Negri (?–1624)
Giovanni Cesare Netti (1649–1686)
Niccolò da Perugia (later 14th century)
Bruno Nicolai (1926–1991)
Giuseppe Nicolini (1762–1842)
Piero Niro (born 1957)
Giovanni Domenico da Nola (c. 1510/20–1592), also known as Nolla
Luigi Nono (1924–1990)
Michele Novaro (1818–1885), composed national anthem of the current Italian Republic
Emanuele Nutile (1862–1932)

O
Nino Oliviero (1918–1980)
Giacomo Orefice (1865–1922)
Ferdinando Orlandi (1774–1848)
Nora Orlandi (born 1933)
Alessandro Orologio (1550–1633)
Riz Ortolani (1926–2014)

P
Antonio Maria Pacchioni (1654–1738)
Giorgio Pacchioni (born 1947)
Daniele Pace (1935–1985)
Roy Paci (born 1969)
Pacifico (born 1964), stage name of Luigi De Crescenzo
Giovanni Pacini (1796–1867)
Annibale Padovano (1527–1575)
Ferdinando Paer (1771–1839)
Niccolò Paganini (1782–1840), virtuoso violinist and composer, wrote the 24 Caprices for violin
Giovanni Paisiello (1740–1816)
Giovanni Pierluigi da Palestrina (c.1525–1594), Renaissance master of polyphonic church music
Benedetto Pallavicino (c.1551–1601)
Antonio Pampani (c. 1705–1775)
Giovanni Antonio Pandolfi [Mealli] (1624–c.1687)
Paolo Pandolfo (born 1964)
Gino Paoli (born 1934)
Paolo da Firenze (c.1355–c.1436)
Girolamo Parabosco (c. 1524–1557)
Pietro Domenico Paradisi (1707–1791)
Susanna Parigi (born 1961)
Antonio Pasculli (1842–1924)
Bernardo Pasquini (1637–1710)
Carlo Pedini (born 1956)
Teodorico Pedrini (1671–1746)
Arrigo Pedrollo (1878–1964)
Carlo Pedrotti (1817–1893)
Danilo Pennone (born 1963)
Peppino di Capri (born 1939), born Giuseppe Faiella
Davide Perez (1711–1778)
Giovanni Battista Pergolesi (1710–1736), born Giovanni Battista Draghi
Achille Peri (1812–1880)
Jacopo Peri (1561–1633), composer of the first opera (Dafne) and first surviving opera (Euridice)
Lorenzo Perosi (1872–1956)
Marziano Perosi (1875–1959), brother of Lorenzo
Giacomo Antonio Perti (1661–1756)
Maria Xaveria Perucona (c. 1652–after 1709), also Parruccona
Giovanni Battista Pescetti (c.1704–1766)
Michele Pesenti (c.1470–after 1524)
Alberto Pestalozza (1851–1934)
Goffredo Petrassi (1904–2003)
Giuseppe Petrini
Pietro Pettoletti (c. 1795–c. 1870)
Max Pezzali (born 1967)
Riccardo Piacentini (born 1958)
Carlo Alfredo Piatti (1822–1901)
Giovanni Picchi (1571/72–1643)
Alessandro Piccinini (1566–c. 1638)
Niccolò Piccinni (1728–1800)
Piero Piccioni (1921–2004)
Riccardo Pick-Mangiagalli (1882–1949)
Maestro Piero (before 1300–c. 1350)
Franco Piersanti (born 1950)
Giuseppe Pietri (1886–1946)
Giusto Pio (1926–2017)
Nicola Piovani (born 1946)
Bernardo Pisano (1490–1548)
Berto Pisano (1928–2002)
Franco Pisano (1922–1977), brother of Berto
Maurizio Pisati (born 1959)
Giuseppe Ottavio Pitoni (1657–1743)
Ildebrando Pizzetti (1880–1968), opera composer best known for Assassinio nella cattedrale
Emilio Pizzi (1861–1940)
Pietro Platania (1828–1907)
Giovanni Benedetto Platti (c.1697–1763)
Gianfranco Plenizio (1941–2017)
Alessandro Poglietti (early 17th century–1683)
Pier Paolo Polcari (born 1969)
Amilcare Ponchielli (1834–1886), Romantic opera composer known for La Gioconda
Nicola Porpora (1686–1768), Baroque opera composer
Giuseppe Porsile (1680–1750)
Costanzo Porta (1528/29–1601)
Giovanni Porta (c. 1675–1755)
Gasparo Pratoneri (fl. 1556/59), nicknamed Spirito da Reggio
Luca Antonio Predieri (1688–1767)
Roberto Pregadio (1928–2010)
Paola Prestini (born 1975)
Giovanni Priuli (c. 1575–1626)
Marieta Morosina Priuli (fl. 1665)
Roberto Procaccini (born 1971)
Teresa Procaccini (born 1934)
Ignazio Prota (1690–1748)
Francesco Provenzale (1624–1704)
Oscar Prudente (born 1944)
Domenico Puccini (1772–1815), grandson and grandfather of namesake composers Giacomo Puccini
Giacomo Puccini (1858–1924), late Romantic opera composer (La bohème, Tosca, Turandot, Madama Butterfly)
Giacomo Puccini (senior) (1712–1781), great-great-grandfather of namesake opera composer
Gaetano Pugnani (1731–1798)

Q
Paolo Quagliati (c. 1555–1628)
Lucia Quinciani (c. 1566, fl. 1611)

R
Pietro Raimondi (1786–1853)
Giacomo Rampini (1680–1760), and namesake nephew (d. 1811)
Matteo Rampollini (1497–1553)
Virgilio Ranzato (1883–1937)
Renato Rascel (1912–1991)
Oreste Ravanello (1871–1938)
Gino Redi (1908–1962), born Luigi Pulci, also credited as P.G. Redi
Licinio Refice (1883–1954)
Tony Renis (born 1938), born Elio Cesari
Paolo Renosto (1935–1988)
Elsa Respighi (1894–1996), born Elsa Olivieri-Sangiacomo, wife of Ottorino
Ottorino Respighi (1879–1936), known for his symphonic poems The Fountains of Rome and The Pines of Rome
Gian Franco Reverberi (born 1934)
Gian Piero Reverberi (born 1939), brother of Gian Franco
Giovanni Battista Riccio (late 16th century–after 1621), also known as Giambattista Riccio
Vittorio Rieti (1898–1994), composer of Barabau
Giovanni Antonio Rigatti (c. 1613–1648)
Rinaldo di Capua (c.1705–c.1780)
Giovanni Alberto Ristori (1692–1753)
Andrea Rocca (born 1969)
Rocco Rodio (c.1535–after 1615)
Francesco Rognoni (late 16th century–after 1626), son of Riccardo
Riccardo Rognoni (c.1550–before 1620), also Richardo Rogniono
Alessandro Rolla (1757–1841)
Antonio Rolla (1798–1837), born Giuseppe Antonio Rolla, son of Alessandro
Fausto Romitelli (1963–2004)
Lucia Ronchetti (born 1963)
Stefano Ronchetti-Monteviti (1814–1882)
Renzo Rossellini (1908–1982)
Camilla de Rossi (fl. 1707–1710)
Luigi Rossi (c.1597–1653)
Michelangelo Rossi (1601/02–1656)
Salamone Rossi (c.1570–1630)
Gioachino Rossini (1792–1868), best known for The Barber of Seville and overtures to other operas such as William Tell
Nino Rota (1911–1979)
Giovanni Rovetta (1596–1668)
Francesco Rovigo (1540/41–1597)
Ernesto Rubin de Cervin (1936–2013)
Bonaventura Rubino (c.1600–1668)
Vincenzo Ruffo (c.1508–1587)
Claudia Rusca (1593–1676)
Giacomo Rust (1741–1786), also Rusti
Paolo Rustichelli (born 1953)
Giovanni Marco Rutini (1723–1797)

S
Victor de Sabata (1892–1967)
Nicola Sabatino (1705–1796)
Nicola Sabini (c. 1675 – 1705)
Antonio Sabino (1591–1650)
Francesco Sabino (1620–?)
Giovanni Maria Sabino (1588–1649)
Antonio Sacchini (1730–1786)
Nicola Sala (1713–1801)
Antonio Salieri (1750–1825)
Giovanni Salvatore (c.1620–c.1688)
Giovanni Battista Sammartini (c.1700–1775)
Giuseppe Sammartini (1695–1750)
Giovanni Felice Sances (c. 1600–1679), also known as Sancies, Sanci, Sanes, Sanchez
Antonia Sarcina (born 1963)
Domenico Sarro (1679–1744)
Giuseppe Sarti (1729–1802)
Francesco Sartori (born 1957)
Antonio Sartorio (1630–1680)
Carlo Savina (1919–2002)
Virgilio Savona (1919–2009)
Rosario Scalero (1870–1954), also Natale Rosario Scalero
Antonio Scandello (1517–1580)
Alessandro Scarlatti (1660–1725), father of Pietro and Domenico, brother of Francesco, uncle or grand-uncle of Giuseppe
Domenico Scarlatti (1685–1757), influential in the development of the Classical style
Francesco Scarlatti (1666–c. 1741)
Giuseppe Scarlatti (1718/23–1777)
Pietro Filippo Scarlatti (1679–1750)
Giacinto Scelsi (1905–1988)
Salvatore Sciarrino (born 1947)
Flavio Emilio Scogna (born 1956)
Giulio Segni (1498–1561), also Julio Segni or Julio da Modena
Nello Segurini (1910–1988)
Giuseppe Sellitti (1700–1777), also Sellitto
Kristian Sensini (born 1976)
Renato Serio (born 1946)
Paolo Serrao (1830–1907)
Claudia Sessa (c. 1570–c. 1617/19)
Giovanni Sgambati (1841–1914)
Louis Siciliano (born 1975), alsoALUEI
Carlo Siliotto (born 1950)
Achille Simonetti (1857–1928), violinist and composer
Claudio Simonetti (born 1952)
Enrico Simonetti (1924–1978), father of Claudio
Leone Sinigaglia (1868–1944)
Giuseppe Sinopoli (1946–2001)
Maddalena Laura Sirmen (1745–1818), born Maddalena Laura Lombardini
Camillo Sivori (1815–1894), also Ernesto Camillo Sivori
Umberto Smaila (born 1950)
Roberto Soffici (born 1946)
Giovanni Sollima (born 1962)
Giovanni Battista Somis (1686–1763), violinist and composer, brother of Lorenzo
Francesco Soriano (1548/49–1621)
Vincenzo Spampinato (born 1953)
Francesco Spinacino (fl. 1507)
Gaspare Spontini (1774–1851)
Annibale Stabile (c.1535–1595), Roman School composer, pupil of Palestrina
Agostino Steffani (1653–1728)
Scipione Stella (1558/59–1622)
Bernardo Storace (fl. 1664)
Alessandro Stradella (1639–1682)
Feliciano Strepponi (1797–1832), opera composer, father of Giuseppina Strepponi
Alessandro Striggio (c. 1536/37–1592)
Marco Stroppa (born 1959)
Barbara Strozzi (1619–1677)

T
Giuseppe Tartini (1692–1770), famous for the Devil's Trill Sonata
Pierantonio Tasca (1858–1934)
Giuliano Taviani (born 1969)
Giovanni Tebaldini (1864–1952)
Vince Tempera (born 1946)
Luigi Tenco (1938–1967)
Carlo Tessarini (1690–1766)
Giovanni Angelo Testagrossa (1470–1530)
Camillo Togni (1922–1993)
Luigi Tomasini (1741–1808)
Andrea Tonoli (Born 1991)
Giuseppe Torelli (1658–1709)
Pietro Torri (c. 1650–1737)
Giuseppe Felice Tosi (1619–1693)
Pier Francesco Tosi (1653/54–1732)
Paolo Tosti (1846–1916)
Antonio Tozzi (1736–1812)
Umberto Tozzi (born 1952)
Giovanni Maria Trabaci (c. 1575–1647)
Tommaso Traetta (1727–1779)
Giuseppe Tricarico (1623–1697)
Giacomo Tritto (1733–1824)
Bartolomeo Tromboncino (c. 1470 – c. 1535), trombonist, frottolist, murderer
Armando Trovajoli (1917–2013)
Gerardina Trovato (born 1967)
Francesco Turini (c. 1595–1656)

U
Marco Uccellini (1603/10–1680)
Vincenzo Ugolini (c. 1580–1638)
Piero Umiliani (1926–2001)
Francesco Antonio Urio (1631/32–c. 1719)
Gennaro Ursino (1650–1715)
Francesco Usper (or Sponga) (1561–1641)
Teo Usuelli (1920–2009)
Francesco Uttini (1723–1795)

V
Nicola Vaccai (1790–1848), also Vaccaj
Antonio Valente (fl. 1565–80)
Giovanni Valentini (c. 1582–1649)
Giovanni Valentini (c. 1750–1804)
Giuseppe Valentini (1681–1753)
Celso Valli (born 1950)
Francesco Antonio Vallotti (1697–1780)
Ivan Vandor (1932–2020)
Orazio Vecchi (1550–1605)
Gaetano Veneziano (1665–1716)
Antonio Veracini (1659–1733)
Francesco Maria Veracini (1690–1768)
Giuseppe Verdi (1813–1901), opera composer best known for Rigoletto, Nabucco, Aida and La traviata
Lodovico Grossi da Viadana (c. 1560–1627)
Edoardo Vianello (born 1938)
Nicola Vicentino (1511–1575/76)
Vincenzo da Rimini (14th century)
Leonardo Vinci (1690–1730)
Francesco dalla Viola (died 1568)
Giovanni Viotti (1755–1824), Classical era violin teacher whose music was later praised by Brahms
Carlo Virzì (born 1972)
Giovanni Battista Vitali (1632–1692)
Tomaso Antonio Vitali (1663–1745)
Franco Vittadini (1884–1948)
Antonio Vivaldi (1678–1741), wrote over 600 concerti, including The Four Seasons
Giovanni Buonaventura Viviani (1638–c. 1693)
Lucrezia Orsina Vizzana (1590–1662)
Roman Vlad (1919–2013), Italian composer, pianist, and musicologist of Romanian birth

W
Ermanno Wolf-Ferrari (1876–1948)

Y
Pietro Yon (1886–1943)

Z
Antonio Zacara da Teramo (1350/60 – 1413/16)
Lodovico Zacconi (1555–1627)
Nicolaus Zacharie (c. 1400–1466)
Mario Zafred (1922–1987)
Giovanni Zamboni (c. 1664–c. 1721)
Bruno Zambrini (born 1935)
Aidan Zammit (born 1965)
Riccardo Zandonai (1883–1944)
Gasparo Zanetti (c. 1600–1660)
Andrea Zani (1696–1757)
Uberto Zanolli (1917–1994)
Gioseffo Zarlino (1517–1590)
Lorenzo Zavateri (1690–1764)
Marc'Antonio Ziani (c. 1653–1715)
Pietro Andrea Ziani (1616–1684)
Niccolò Antonio Zingarelli (1752–1837)
Domenico Zipoli (1688–1726)
Matteo Zocarini (fl. 1740)
Carlo Zuccari (1703–1792)
Diego Zucchinetti (18th century)

References

Italian
Composers
 
Composers